Protetragonites is an extinct genus of ammonoid cephalopods belonging to the  family Lytoceratidae. These fast-moving nektonic carnivores  lived from the Jurassic period Tithonian age to the Cretaceous period Aptian age.

Species

 Protetragonites crebrisulcatus Uhlig, 1883
 Protetragonites obliquestrangulatum (Kilian, 1889)
 Protetragonites quadrisulcatus d'Orbigny, 1841
 Protetragonites zuegeli Maisch & Salfinger-Maisch, 2016

Description
Shells show few constrictions and a circular or triangular section.

Distribution
Fossils of species within this genus have been found in the Cretaceous rocks of Austria, Canada, Czech Republic, Slovakia, Dominican Republic, France, Hungary, Madagascar, Morocco, Poland, Spain, Russia, Ukraine, Western Sahara, as well in the Jurassic of Germany, Hungary and Italy.

References

External links
 Lithotheque.France

Jurassic ammonites
Cretaceous ammonites
Ammonites of Europe
Tithonian first appearances
Early Cretaceous genus extinctions
Ammonitida genera
Lytoceratidae